These are the official results of the Men's High Jump event at the 1987 IAAF World Championships in Rome, Italy. There were a total of 38 participating athletes, with two qualifying groups and the final held on Sunday September 6, 1987.

Medalists

Schedule
All times are Central European Time (UTC+1)

Abbreviations
All results shown are in metres

Records

Results

Qualifying round
Held on Saturday 1987-09-05

Final

See also
 1983 Men's World Championships High Jump (Helsinki)
 1984 Men's Olympic High Jump (Los Angeles)
 1984 Men's Friendship Games High Jump (Moscow)
 1986 Men's European Championships High Jump (Stuttgart)
 1988 Men's Olympic High Jump (Seoul)
 1990 Men's European Championships High Jump (Split)
 1991 Men's World Championships High Jump (Tokyo)

References

External links
 Results

H
High jump at the World Athletics Championships